"I'll Bee Dat!" is a song by American hip hop artist Redman recorded for his fourth album Doc's da Name 2000 (1998). The song was released as the first single for the album on October 8, 1998.

Track listing
12", Vinyl
"I'll Bee Dat!" (Radio Edit)
"I'll Bee Dat!" (LP Version)
"I'll Bee Dat!" (Instrumental)
"Well All Rite Cha" (Radio Edit)feat. Method Man
"Well All Rite Cha" (LP Version)feat. Method Man
"Well All Rite Cha" (Instrumental)

CD, Maxi
"I'll Bee Dat!" (Explicit)
"Well All Rite Cha" (Explicit)feat. Method Man
"Pick It Up" (Warren G Remix)
"I'll Bee Dat!" (Instrumental)

Chart performance

Personnel
Information taken from Discogs.
mixing – Bob Brown
production – Erick Sermon, Rockwilder, Warren G
rapping – Redman
remixing – Warren G

Notes

External links

1998 singles
Redman (rapper) songs
Song recordings produced by Rockwilder
Def Jam Recordings singles
1998 songs
Songs written by Redman (rapper)

Music videos directed by Director X